My Voice may refer to:

 My Voice (film), a 2002 international film directed by Flora Gomes
 My Voice (album), a 2017 album by South Korean singer Taeyeon
MyVoice, a longitudinal health research study administered by text message